The Kings of Ui Fiachrach Muaidhe were the northern branch of Ui Fiachrach, based on the plain of the Muaidhe (valley of the River Moy).

The early members of the dynasty were Kings of Connacht, but were eclipsed by the Ui Briuin by the 8th century. By the 12th century the ruling dynasty adopted the surname Ó Dubhda

Ui Fiachrach Muaidhe Kings of Connacht

 Dúnchad Muirisci mac Tipraite, d.683
 Indrechtach mac Dúnchado Muirisci, d.707
 Airechtach ua Dunchadh Muirsce, d. 730
 Ailill Medraige mac Indrechtaig, d.764
 Donn Cothaid mac Cathail, d.773

Kings of Ui Fiachrach Muaidhe

 Connmhach mac Duinn Cothaid, died 787
 Cathal mac Ailell, died 812.
 Dubda mac Connmhach, fl. 9th–10th century
 Aed mac Mael Padraig, d. 905
 Mael Cluiche mac Conchobar, d. 909.
 Crichan mac Mael Muire, died 937.
 Aed Ua Dubhda, died 983.
 Mael Ruanaidh Ua Dubhda, d. 1005.
 Aedhuar Ua Dubhda, d. 1059.
 Muirchertach An Cullach Ua Dubhda, d. 1096.
 Domnall Find Ua Dubhda, d. 1125
 Mac Aodh Ua Dubhda, d. 1128.
 Amhlaibh mac Domhnaill Fhinn Ua Dubhda, d. 1135.
 Mac Domhnaill Ua Dubhda, d. 1136.
 Aodh mac Muirchertach Ua Dubhda, died 1143.
 Ruaidhrí Mear Ua Dubhda, Ruaidhri Mear mac Tailtigh mec Neill Ua Dubh, ri o Roba go Codnuigh/(king from [the rivers] Roba to Codhnach.
 An Cosnmhaidh Ua Dubhda, died 1162.
 Taichleach Ua Dubhda, died 1192.
 Donnchadh Ó Dubhda, fl. 1213.
 Maelruanaidh Ó Dubhda, died 1221.
 Brian Dearg Ó Dubhda, d. 1242.
 Taichlech mac Maelruanaid Ó Dubhda, d. 1282.
 Conchobair Ó Dubhda, died 1291.
 Sén-Brian Ó Dubhda, died 1354 King of Ui Fiachrach and Ui Amhalghaid, died in his own house having been 84 years in lordship.
 Donell Ó Dubhda, fl. 1371, died 1380.
 Ruaidhrí Ó Dubhda, fl. 1380–1417
 Tadhg Riabhach Ó Dubhda, d. 1432.

See also O'Dowd Chiefs of the Name.

External links
http://celt.ucc.ie/publishd.html
http://www.rootsweb.ancestry.com/~irlkik/ihm/connacht.htm

References

 The History of Mayo, p. 303, Hubert T. Knox, 1908.
 Byrne, Francis John (1973). Irish Kings and High Kings. Dublin.
 Araile do fhlathaibh Ua nDubhda/Some of the princes of Ui Dhubhda, pp. 676–681, Leabhar na nGenealach:The Great Book of Irish Genealogies, Dubhaltach Mac Fhirbhisigh (died 1671), eag. Nollaig Ó Muraíle, 2004–05, De Burca, Dublin.
 
 
 
 
 Revised edition of McCarthy's synchronisms at Trinity College Dublin.

Irish royal families
Kings
Medieval Ireland
Lists of Irish monarchs